The 2014 Giro del Trentino Alto Adige-Südtirol was the 21st running of the Giro del Trentino Alto Adige-Südtirol a women's bicycle race in Italy. Apart from the other editions, it was this year a one-day race instead of a stage race. It was held on 21 June over a distance of km. It was rated by the UCI as a 1.1 category race.

Results

References

Cycle races in Italy